Canadian-American Records is a record label founded by Leonard Zimmer and based in New York City and Winnipeg, Manitoba. The most popular artists for the label were the duo of Santo & Johnny and the singer Linda Scott. The label is based in Lititz, Pennsylvania.

References

External links
Canadian-American Records story and discography from BSN Pubs

American record labels
Pop record labels
Record labels established in 1957